Błędów  is a village in Grójec County, Masovian Voivodeship, in east-central Poland. It is the seat of the gmina (administrative district) called Gmina Błędów.

The village has a population of 1,100.

References

External links
 Jewish Community in Błędów on Virtual Shtetl

Villages in Grójec County
Warsaw Voivodeship (1919–1939)